Nationality words link to articles with information on the nation's poetry or literature (for instance, Irish or France).

Events
 April 6 – Rudyard Kipling and W. B. Yeats are awarded the Gothenburg Prize for Poetry.
 September – T. S. Eliot (with his first love, Emily Hale) visits the English Cotswolds manor house and garden which gives rise to his poem Burnt Norton.
 September 21 – The Barretts of Wimpole Street, a film directed by Sidney Franklin with Norma Shearer as Elizabeth Barrett and Fredric March as Robert Browning, is released in the United States; remade in 1957, less successfully
Bengali poet Buddhadeb Bosu marries singer and writer Protiva Bose (née Ranu Shome).
The University Review is founded at the University of Kansas City. The publication is later called New Letters.
 West Indian Review founded.

Works published in English

Canada
Kenneth Leslie, Windward Rock: Poems. New York: Macmillan.
 Tom MacInnes, High Low Along.
 Frederick George Scott, Collected Poems. Vancouver: Clarke & Stuart Co. Ltd.
Charles G.D. Roberts, The Iceberg and Other Poems. (Toronto: Ryerson).
 Theodore Goodridge Roberts, The Leather Bottle
Seranus, Penelope and Other Poems (Toronto: Author).

India, in English
 Sri Aurobindo, Six Poems ( Poetry in English ), Chandernagore: Rameshwar and Co.
 Harindranath Chattopadhyaya, Cross Road ( Poetry in English ), Madras: Shama's Publishing House
 P. R. Kaikini, Flower Offerings ( Prose poems in English ) ; Bombay: Bombay Book Depot
 E. E. Speight, editor, Indian Masters of English ( Poetry in English ),  London: Longmans, Green; anthology;  published in the United Kingdom

United Kingdom
 Edmund Blunden, Choice or Chance
 Maud Bodkin, Archetypal Patterns of Poetry: Psychological Studies of Imagination, criticism
 Lilian Bowes Lyon, The White Hare
 Roy Campbell, Broken Record, the first version of his autobiography; South African native published in the United Kingdom
 Helen Cruickshank, Up the Noran Water, Scottish poet
 Lawrence Durrell, Transition
 T. S. Eliot, The Rock
 William Golding, Poems
 Pauline Gower, Piffling Poems for Pilots
 I. M. and H. Hubbard, The War Resisters, and Other Poems
 T. L. W. Hubbard, Poems, 1925–1934
 John Lehmann, The Noise of History
 Hugh MacDiarmid, pen name of Christopher Murray Grieve, Stony Limits and Other Poems, Scottish poet
 Ruth Pitter, A Mad Lady's Garland, preface by Hilaire Belloc
 Nan Shepherd, In the Cairngorms
 William Soutar, The Solitary Way
 E. E. Speight, editor, Indian Masters of English,  London: Longmans, Green; anthology; Indian poetry in English, published in the United Kingdom
 Stephen Spender, Vienna
 Dylan Thomas, 18 Poems, including "The Force that Through the Green Fuse Drives the Flower"
 W. B. Yeats, The King of the Great Clock Tower, Irish poet published in the United Kingdom

United States
 James Agee, Permit Me Voyage
 W. H. Auden, Poems
 Paul Engle, American Song
 John A. Lomax, compiler, with Alan Lomax, American Ballads and Folk Songs
 Edna St. Vincent Millay, Wine From These Grapes
 George Oppen, Discrete Series
 Ezra Pound:
 Eleven new Cantos: XXXI–XLI
Homage to Sextus Propertius, London
 "Make It New"
 Edward Arlington Robinson, Amaranth
 Jesse Stuart, Man with a Bull-Tongue Plow
 William Carlos Williams, Collected Poems 1921–1931
 Yvor Winters, Before Disaster

Other in English
 R. A. K. Mason, No New Thing, New Zealand
 Shaw Neilson, Collected Poems of John Shaw Neilson, edited and with introduction by R. H. Croll, Melbourne, Lothian, Australia
 W. B. Yeats, The King of the Great Clock Tower, Irish poet published in the United Kingdom

Works published in other languages

France
 Louis Aragon, Hourra l'oural
 André Breton, L'Air de l'eau
 René Char, Le Marteau sans maître
 Paul Éluard, pen name of Paul-Eugène Grindel, La Rose publique
 Alphonse Métérié:
 Petit maroc II
 Cophetuesques
 Benjamin Péret, De derrière les fagots
 Jules Supervielle, Les Amis inconnus

Indian subcontinent
Including all of the British colonies that later became India, Pakistan, Bangladesh, Sri Lanka and Nepal. Listed alphabetically by first name, regardless of surname:

Hindi
 Gopal Sharan, Umanga, on themes of patriotism and love of nature
 Mahadevi Varma, Nirja
 Rameshvar Shukla, Kiran Bela

Kashmiri
 Fazil Kashmiri, Saz-e-Chaman
 Mahjoor, "Nera Ha Sanyas Lagith", a poem published in a special number of Martand
 Man Ji Suri, Krishna Avtar, a masnavi on Krishna, but also including devotional lyrics in the vatsan form

Telugu
 Durbhaka Rajesekhara Satavadhani, Rana Pratapa Simha Caritra, called one of the "five modern epics", or Panca Kavya's in Telugu poetry; written in 5 cantos, with about 2,000 verses, in classical style, based on the Annals and Andiquities of Rajasthan by James Dodd
 Meka Ramachandra Appa Rao, translator, Amaruka, translation from English of Omar Khayyam's Rubbayit
 Tripurancni Ramaswami, Sutapuranam, poem criticizing Aryan mythologies; written in a classical style
 Pingali Lakshmikantam and Katuri Venkateshvara Rao, Saundaranandamu, epic in nine cantos, based on a Sanskrit poem by Asvagosha

Other Indian languages

 D. R. Bendre, also known as Ambikatanaya Datta, Murtu Mattu Kamakasturi, long, philosophical poem in 11 parts and 15 love songs; influenced by A.E.'s The Candle of Vision; Kannada
 Govinda Krishna Chettur, The Shadow of God, 37 sonnets in Kashmiri and a short prefatory poem in English; modeled on Alfred Lord Tennyson's In Memoriam
 Khavirakpan, Smaran mangal Kavya, humorous poems in Meitei
 Kirpa Sagar, Dido Jamval, epic on the actions of Maharaja Ranjit Singh in the Jammu area; Punjabi
 Masti Venkatesa Iyengar, Malara, a book that introduced the sonnet form into Kannada poetry; the 82 sonnets approach different subjects, including day-to-day life and the change of seasons, from a very religious point of view and in an uncomplicated, conversational style
 N. Balamani Amma, Amma, on a mother's love and a child's innocence; Malayalam
 Narayan Murlidhar Gupte, writing under the pen name "Bee", Phulanci Onjal ("Handful of Flowers"), showing the influence of Kesavsut; Marathi
 Pramathanath Bisi, Pracin Asami Haite, sonnets written from 1924 to 1927 from the most prolific published sonnet-writer in Bengali; a companion volume, Bracin Parasik Haite, was published in the late 1960s
 Umashankur Joshi, Gangotri, Gujarati-language
 Vinayak Damodar Savarkar, Savarakaranci Sphuta Kavita, including "Sagaras" ("To the Sea"), and patriotic poems such as "Maze Mrtypatra" ("My Will") and "Maranonmukh Sayyevar" ("Upon the death-bed"); by a Marathi revolutionary

Other languages
 José Santos Chocano, Primicias de Oro de Indias, Peru
 Constantin S. Nicolăescu-Plopșor – Ghileà romanè (anthology)
 Martinus Nijhoff, Awater, Netherlands
 Alejandro Peralta, El Kollao, Peru
 Fernando Pessoa, Mensagem (Message), Portugal
 Heiti Talvik, Palavik (Fever), Estonia
 Ernst Volkman, ed., Deutsche Dichtung im Weltkrieg, Germany

Awards and honors
 Pulitzer Prize for Poetry: Robert Hillyer: Collected Verse
 Queen's Gold Medal for Poetry: Laurence Whistler

Births
Death years link to the corresponding "[year] in poetry" article:
 January 1 – Muthaffar al-Nawab (died 2022) Iraqi poet and political critic
 January 6 – John Wieners (died 2002), American lyric poet
 January 22 – Sugathakumari (died 2020), Indian Malayalam female poet and activist
 February 10 – Fleur Adcock, expatriate New Zealand poet and editor who lives much of her life in England
 February 18 – Audre Lorde (died 1992), African American writer, poet and activist
 February 27 – N. Scott Momaday, Native American poet and writer
 March 31 – Kamala Surayya (died 2009), Indian poet and writer in English and Malayalam, her native language, Indian English
 March 20 – David Malouf, Australian poet and writer
 April 11 – Mark Strand (died 2014), American poet
 April 12 – Anselm Hollo (died 2013), Finnish-American poet and translator also resident for eight years in the United Kingdom, where his poems are included in British poetry anthologies.
 May 10 – Jayne Cortez (died 2012), African-American poet
 June 15 – Hettie Jones, born Hettie Cohen, American poet, writer and first wife of Amiri Baraka
 July 1 – James Liddy (died 2008), Irish American poet
 July 13 – Wole Soyinka, Nigerian writer, poet and playwright who in 1986 is the first African to win the Nobel Prize in Literature
 July 17 – Rainer Kirsch (died 2015), German writer and poet
 July 18 – Walt McDonald, American poet and academic
 July 20 – Henry Dumas (died 1968), African-American writer and poet
 August 5 – Wendell Berry, American novelist, essayist, poet, professor, cultural critic and farmer
 August 6 – Diane di Prima (died 2020), American poet associated with the Beats
 September 2 – Jack Agüeros (died 2014), American community activist, poet, writer and translator
 September 7 – Sunil Gangopadhyay (died 2012), Indian Bengali-language poet
 September 9 – Sonia Sanchez, African-American poet, playwright and children's book author associated with the Black Arts Movement
 September 21 – Leonard Cohen (died 2016), Canadian-born poet, singer-songwriter and novelist
 September 23 – M. Travis Lane, American-Canadian poet
 October 7 – Amiri Baraka, born LeRoi Jones (died 2014), African-American poet, playwright, essayist and music critic whose first wife is poet Hettie Jones
 November 7  – Beverly Dahlen, American poet
 November 15 – Ted Berrigan (died 1983), American poet and political activist
 November 19 – Joanne Kyger (died 2017), American poet
 November 25 – Shakti Chattopadhyay (died 1995), Bengali poet
 November 28 – Ted Walker (died 2004), English poet, short story writer, travel writer, television and radio dramatist and broadcaster
 December 17 – Binoy Majumdar (died 2006), Bengali poet
 December 29 – Forugh Farrokhzad (died 1967), Iranian poet and film director
 Also:
 Muhammad al-Maghut (died 2006), Syrian Ismaili poet
 Stephen Berg, American
 Sugatha Kumari, Indian, Malayalam-language poet
 Heather Spears, Canadian-born poet, novelist and artist

Deaths
Birth years link to the corresponding "[year] in poetry" article:
 January 8 – Andrei Bely (born 1880), Russian novelist, poet and critic
 March 7 – Ernst Enno (born 1875), Estonian
 March 25 – Arthur Alfred Lynch (born 1861), Australian-born, Irish and British civil engineer, physician, journalist, author, soldier, anti-imperialist and polymath who served as a member of the House of Commons after being convicted of treason, sentenced to death, having his sentence reduced and then being released (for having recruited volunteers for the Boer side during the Boer War, in South Africa); towards the end of World War I raised his own Irish battalion
 June 14 – John Gray (born 1866), English
 July 4 – Hayim Nahman Bialik (born 1873), Hebrew
 August 19 – Jean Blewett (born 1862), Canadian
 September 26 – Inoue Kenkabō 井上剣花坊 pen name of Inoue Koichi (born 1870), late Meiji, Taishō and early Shōwa period Japanese journalist and writer of senryū (short, humorous verse) (surname: Inoue)
 December 3 – Catherine Pozzi (born 1882), French poet and woman of letters
 John Ferrar Holms (born 1897), British critic

See also

Poetry
 List of poetry awards
 List of years in poetry

Notes

20th-century poetry
Poetry